Benton Community High School is a rural public high school located in Van Horne, Iowa. It is the only high school in the Benton Community School District, and serves students from Van Horne, Atkins, Blairstown, Elberon, Keystone, Newhall, Norway and Watkins.

History
While the Benton Community School District was formed in 1964, Benton Community High School did not open until the fall of 1965. The new BCHS drew students from the former Keystone School District, Van Horne School District, Newhall School District and Blairstown School District. Beginning in 1967, BCHS absorbed students from the former Elberon Independent School District.
In a controversial 1991 decision, nearby Norway High School was merged into BCHS.

Demographics
The student body of BCHS is 96 percent white, two percent Hispanic, and one percent black, while all other races make up the remaining one percent.

Athletics
Benton Community's athletic teams compete in the WaMaC Conference in the following sports: baseball, basketball, cross country, football, golf, soccer, softball, track and field, volleyball and wrestling.

Performing arts

BCHS also has a competitive marching band program.

Notable alumni
 Amber Fiser, softball player
 Thomas Gerhold, member of the Iowa House of Representatives
 Chad Hennings, American football player

See also
List of high schools in Iowa

References

Educational institutions established in 1965
Public high schools in Iowa
Schools in Benton County, Iowa
Iowa High School Athletic Association
1965 establishments in Iowa